U.S. standard clothing sizes for women were originally developed from statistical data in the 1940s and 1950s. At that time, they were similar in concept to the EN 13402 European clothing size standard, although individual manufacturers have always deviated from them, sometimes significantly.

However, as a result of various cultural pressures, most notably vanity sizing, North American clothing sizes have drifted substantially away from this standard over time, and now have very little connection to it. Instead, they now follow the more loosely defined standards known as U.S. catalog sizes.

Body measurements below are given in inches.

History

Men's standard sizes were probably developed first during the American Revolutionary War, and they were in regular use by the American army during the War of 1812 for ready-made uniforms . These were based on the chest measurement, with other measurements being assumed to be either proportional (the circumference of the neck, waist, hips, and thighs) or easily altered (length of the inseam) .

As this was largely successful in men, the same approach was attempted in the early 20th century for women using the bust as the sole measurement . However, this proved unsuccessful because women's bodies have far more variety in shape. The hourglass figure is frequently used as an industry standard, but only 8% of women have this body shape . A woman with an hourglass figure and a woman with an apple-shaped figure who have the same bust size will not have the same waist or hip sizes.

This was a significant problem for mail-order companies, and several attempts at predictable, standard sizing were made . In the 1940s, the statisticians Ruth O'Brien and William Shelton received a Works Progress Administration grant to conduct the most ambitious effort to solve this problem. Their team measured almost 15,000 women across the US. After discovering the complex diversity of women's actual sizes, which produced five to seven body shapes, they proposed a three-part sizing system. Each size would be the combination of a single number, representing an upper body measurement, plus an indicator for height (short, regular, and long) and an indication for girth (slim, regular, and stout).  The various combinations of height and girth resulted in nine sizes for each numerical upper-body measurement, which was highly impractical for manufacturing .

As a result, O'Brien and Shelton's work was rejected. In 1958, the National Bureau of Standards invented a new sizing system, based on the hourglass figure and using only the bust size to create an arbitrary standard of sizes ranging from 8 to 38, with an indication for height (short, regular, and tall) and lower-body girth (plus or minus). The resulting commercial standard was not widely popular, and was declared voluntary in 1970 and withdrawn entirely in 1983. In 1995, ASTM International published its own voluntary standard, which has been revised since then . It has not been widely adopted.

Women's sizes
Women's sizes are divided into various types, depending on height. These charts give an indication of size only and are by no means exact as they vary from manufacturer to manufacturer, sometimes by a full inch up and down.

Overview 
There are multiple size types, designed to fit somewhat different body shapes.  Variations include the height of the person's torso (known as back length), whether the bust, waist, and hips are straighter (characteristic of teenagers) or curvier (like many adult women), and whether the bust is higher or lower (characteristic of younger and older women, respectively). These categories include:

Misses sizes  The most common size category.  For women of about average heigh (5'4") with an average bust height and an hourglass figure.  Dress sizes may be given as girth at the bust in inches (e.g., 36), but even-numbered sizes from 2 to 16 are more common.  Categorical sizes range from XS (extra-small) to XL (extra-large).
Junior sizes For short women with higher busts and fairly straight bodies.  Junior sizes are commonly given as odd-numbered sizes from 1 to 15, which correspond to the next number up in misses' sizes.
Women's sizes or plus sizes  For larger women of average height, sometimes with lower bust lines.  Like misses' sizes, the sizes may be given as a dress size based on the bust measurement, but they are usually given as even-numbered sizes from 18 up.  Categorical sizes usually range from 1X (similar to extra-large, but with slightly different proportions compared to the misses' size) up.
Misses petite Made For short women (Usually under 5'4") with average busts and the same shaping characteristics as Regular Misses.  Sizes follow the misses' standard and are marked with a P, as in 10P.
Junior petite For very short women with average busts and fairly straight bodies.  Size may be denoted as "5JP" or as "5P".
Women's petite  For larger, shorter women, sometimes with lower bust lines.  Sizes are marked the same as women's with a P, as in 20P.
Young junior For short women with high busts and fairly straight bodies.
Tall sizes  For taller women (usually 5'8" or above), usually with a proportionately average bust height and an hourglass figure.  Sizes are usually written with the corresponding misses' size and a T to indicate tall, as in "10T".
Half sizes For short women with lower busts and more hourglass body shapes.  Sizes are written with a ½, as in "10½".

Details 

Please compare to your favorite fit charts. These measurements conflict with many other size charts. These charts are significantly smaller than many current US clothing companies.

Girls' sizes

Boys' sizes

Children's sizes

Baby sizes

Conversion from catalog sizes

Companies who publish catalogs may provide the measurements for their sizes, which may vary even among different styles of the same type of garment. The sizes seen in catalogs generally have roughly the following measurements:

With the average American woman's height (20 years and older) at about 63.8" or approximately 5'4" (162.1 cm) , both standard and catalog size ranges attempt to address a variety of weights / builds as well as providing for the "shorter-than-average" height woman with "petite" and "half-sizes". However "taller-than-average" women may find their size-height addressed by manufacturers less frequently, and may often find themselves facing issues of slightly too short pant legs and sleeve cuffs, as well as waist lengths.

Standards
Current and former national standards:
 ASTM D5585-95, 2001, Standard Table of Body Measurements for Adult Female
 ASTM D6829-02, 2008, Standard Tables of Body Measurements for Juniors
 ASTM D5585-11, 2011, Standard Tables of Body Measurements for Adult Female Misses Figure Type, Size Range 00–20
 ASTM D6240-98, 2006, ASTM D6240-98 Standard Tables of Body Measurements for Men Sizes Thirty-Four to Sixty (34 to 60)
 ASTM D6458-99, 2006, Standard Tables of Body Measurements for Boys, Sizes 8 to 14 Slim and 8 to 20 Regular
 ASTM D6960-04, 2004, Standard Table of Body Measurements Relating to Women's Plus Size Figure Type, Sizes 14W-32W 
 CS-151-50 - Infants', Babies', Toddlers' and Children's clothing
 CS-215-58, 1958 - Body measurements for the sizing of Women's patterns and apparel
 PS 42-70, 1971 - Women's Clothing
 PS 36-70 - Boys' Clothing
 PS 45-71 - Young Men's clothing
 PS 54-72 - Girls' Clothing

See also

 Clothing sizes
 EN 13402
 Vanity sizing
 Petite size

References

 
  Provides a complete listing of the standard sizes.
 

Fashion design
Sizes in clothing
Standards of the United States
Customary units of measurement in the United States